Buckingham is a ghost town in Weld County, in the U.S. state of Colorado.

The community was named after C. D. Buckingham, a railroad official.

References

Unincorporated communities in Weld County, Colorado
Unincorporated communities in Colorado
Ghost towns in Colorado